The geography of the Hittite Empire is inferred from Hittite texts on the one hand, and from archaeological excavation on the other. Matching philology to archaeology is a difficult and ongoing task, and so far, only a handful of sites are identified with their ancient name with certainty.

The Hittite kingdom was centered on the lands surrounding Hattusa and Neša, known as "the land of the Hatti" (URUHa-at-ti). After Hattusa was made the Hittite capital, the area encompassed by the bend of the Halys River (which they called the Marassantiya) was considered the core of the empire, and some Hittite laws make a distinction between "this side of the river" and "that side of the river". For example, the reward for the capture of a runaway slave after he managed to flee beyond the Halys is higher than that for a slave caught before he could reach the river.

To the south of the core territory was the land of Kizzuwatna in the area of the Taurus Mountains.
To the west, the confederacies of Arzawa and Assuwa, the second of which in particular may not have indicated a contiguous geographic area.
To the north, the mountain people of the "Kaskians".
To the east, the Mitanni.
After the incorporation or association of Arzawa and Mitanni (under Suppiluliuma I), the Hittite sphere of influence under Mursili II bordered on the "Hayasa-Azzi" to the east, on the "Ahhiyawa" and the newly forming Assuwa league to the west, on Egypt-controlled Canaan to the south, and on Assyria to the south-east.

List of Hittite sites

Acem Hüyük
Tell Açana
Adana
Tell Ahmar
Akar Çay
Aksu Çayı
Alaca Höyük
Aleppo
Alishar Hüyük
Amasya
Andaval
Antakya
Antalya
Arslantepe-Malatya
Asarcık
Bahçe
Bakır Çey
Bergama
Beycesultan
Beyköy
Beyşehir Gölü
Birecik
Bobeypınarı
Bodrum
Boğazkale: Hattusa
Bolkarmaden
Bolu
Bor
Bursa
Büyükmenderes Nehir
Büyüknefes
Çağdın
Çalapverdi
Çankırı in Paphlagonia
Çekerek
Ceyhan Nehir
Çorum
Darende
Dazmana
Delice Su
Demirci-deresi
Devrez Çayı
Didim
Divriği
Efes
Eflatun Pınar
Eğirdir Gölü
Eğrek
Eğriköy
Elbistan
Emirgazi
Ereğli
Erkilet
Ermenek
Eskişehir
Eskiyapar
Tell al-Fakhariyeh
Fasiler
Fraktin
Gâvur Kalesi
Gaziantep
Gediz Nehir
Gilindere
Giresun
Gök Irmak
Gök Su
Gülnar
Gürün
Hama
Hanyeri
Hatip
Havuzköy
Hisarlık: Wilusa
Hüseyindede Tepe
Ilgaz Dağı
Imamkulu
İnandık
Iskendenru
Islâhiye
Ispekçür
Ivriz
Izgın
İzmir
İzmit
İznik
Jekke
Jerablus
Jubayl
Karabel
Karaburçlu
Karaburna
Karahüyük by Elbistan
Karahüyük by Konya

Karaman
Karatepe
Karga
Kaş
Kayalıpınar
Kayseri
Tell Kazel
Kelkit Çay
Kemah
Kilise Tepe
Kinet Hüyük
Kızıl Irmak
Kızıldağ
Konya: Tarhuntassa?
Korucutepe
Kötükale
Köylütolu
Küçükmenderes Nehir
Kültepe: Kaneš
Kürtoğlu
Kurubel
Kuşaklı: Sarissa
Lésvos
Mahalıç
Malkaya
Manisa
Mar'aş
Maşat Hüyük
Menderes Çayı
Mersin
Meskene
Milet
el-Mishrifeh
Mitlini
Mut
Niğde
Nur Dağları
Ortaköy, Çorum: Sapinuwa
Palanga
Porsuk Çay
Pozantı
Qalat el-Mudiq
Ras Shamra
Restan
Saida
Sakarya Nehir
Sakçagözü
Samsat: Samosata
Samsun
Şar
Sart
Şebin Karahısar
Selgin
Seyhan Nehir
Silifke
Sinop
Sipylus
Sirkeli
Sivas
Sivasa
Sivrihisar
Sultanhanı
Tell Tainat
Tarsus
Tasçın
Tekir
Tell Nebi Mend
Topada
Torbalı
Turhal
Tuz Gölü
Tyre
Uşaklı Höyük
Yağri
Yazılıkaya
Zile
Zincirli

References

Garstang & Gurney, Geography of the Hittite Empire (1959)
 Matthews, Oliver & Glatz, Claudia, "The historical geography of north-central Anatolia in the Hittite period: texts and archaeology in concert", Anatolian Studies 59 (2009): 51−72. https://www.academia.edu/462646/The_historical_geography_of_north-central_Anatolia_in_the_Hittite_period_texts_and_archaeology_in_concert

External links
Map of the Hittite Empire
Map of the Hittite Sites
Hittite sites with monuments

 
Sites